In semiotics, a sign relational complex is a generalization of a sign relation that allows for empty components in the elementary sign relations, or sign relational triples of the form (object, sign, interpretant).

Generally speaking, when it comes to things that are being contemplated as ostensible or potential signs of other things, neither the existence nor the uniqueness of the elements appearing in the sign relation is guaranteed.  For example, the reference of a putative sign to its putative objects may achieve reference to zero, to one, or to many objects.  A proper treatment of this complication calls for the conception of something slightly more general than a sign relation proper, namely, a sign relational complex.  In effect, expressed in the roughest practical terms, this allows for missing data in the columns of the relational database table for the sign relation in question.  Typically one operates on the default assumption that all of the roles of elementary sign relations are filled, but remains wary enough of the possible exceptions to deal with them on an ad hoc basis.

See also
 Relation
 Semiotics
 Semiosis
 Sign relation
 Sign system
 Simplicial complex
 Theory of relations
 Triadic relation

References

Semiotics